Rally Costa Smeralda is a rally competition held in Costa Smeralda, a coastal area on the island of Sardinia, Italy. The event was first held in 1978 and it was part of the European Rally Championship schedule until 1994. After the rally was restarted in 1998, it has been part of the Italian Rally Championship.

The rally is based in Arzachena in the north-east part of the island. Unlike the famed tarmac rally held on near neighbour the island of Corsica, the Tour de Corse, the Rally Costa Smeralda is a gravel rally. Italians have dominated the results, the most successful driver in the rally's history is Paolo Andreucci who won the rally seven times between 2001 and 2013.

Winners

External links
Official website
Rally Costa Smeralda at RallyBase

Costa Smeralda
Sport in Sardinia
Costa Smeralda